The 53rd Delaware General Assembly (1829–1830) was a meeting of the legislative branch of the state government, consisting of the Delaware Senate and the Delaware House of Representatives. Elections were held the first Tuesday of October and terms began on the first Tuesday in January. It met in Dover, Delaware, convening January 6, 1829, two weeks before the beginning of the third year of the administration of Governor Charles Polk, Jr.

The apportionment of seats was permanently assigned to three senators and seven representatives for each of the three counties. Population of the county did not effect the number of delegates. Both chambers had a Federalist majority.

Leadership

Senate
Presley Spruance, Jr., Kent County

House of Representatives
William W. Morris, Kent County
John Raymond, Kent County

Members

Senate
Senators were elected by the public for a three-year term, one third posted each year.

House of Representative
Representatives were elected by the public for a one-year term.

References

Places with more information
Delaware Historical Society; website; 505 North Market Street, Wilmington, Delaware 19801; (302) 655-7161
University of Delaware; Library website; 181 South College Avenue, Newark, Delaware 19717; (302) 831-2965

5 053
1829 in Delaware
1830 in Delaware